Platyptilia dschambiya is a moth of the family Pterophoridae. It is known from Yemen and China.

The wingspan is about 23 mm.

References

dschambiya
Moths of the Arabian Peninsula
Moths described in 1999